San Ferry Ann is a 1965 British sound effect comedy. Wordlessly, with soundtrack and sound effects, it tells the story of a holiday crossing from Dover to Calais.

Synopsis
A motley crew of British characters ride the San Ferry Ann to the shores of France, where they embark on a weekend of calamity.

A campervan family, led by Dad and Mum (David Lodge and Joan Sims), create chaos from the moment they set their tyres on the shore, resulting in frequent run-ins with the Gendarmerie. Lewd Grandad (Wilfrid Brambell) finds his own misadventures with a newly-acquainted friend, a crazy German ex-soldier (Ron Moody).

Also aboard for the ride is a saucy hitchhiker (Barbara Windsor), who causes a few heads to turn, including that of a fellow traveller (Ronnie Stevens), who pursues her affection with comic results.

The film appears on the 2021 Blu-ray anthology Futtocks End and Other Stories, along with A Home of Your Own and Vive le Sport, all of which, including the title piece, were produced by Kellet.

Cast
David Lodge as Dad
Joan Sims as Mum
Wilfrid Brambell as Grandad
Barbara Windsor as Hitchhiker
Ron Moody as The German
Ronnie Stevens as Hitchhiker
Rodney Bewes as Lover Boy
Catherine Feller as Lover Girl
Graham Stark as Gendarme
Lynne Carol as Grandma
Warren Mitchell as Maitre d'Hotel 
Aubrey Woods as Immigration Officer 
Hugh Paddick as French Commercial Traveller 
Joan Sterndale-Bennett as Madame
Sandor Elès as Shop Attendant
Fred Emney as Gourmet
Thomas Gallagher as Gardener
Barrie Gosney as Mini Dad
 Paul Grist as Ship's Officer
Bettine Le Beau as French War Museum Attendant
Andreas Malandrinos as Garage Mechanic
Brian Murphy as British Tourist in Garage
Henry Woolf as French Van Driver
Tex Fuller as Onion Man (uncredited)

References

External links
San Ferry Ann at Digital Classics – Official site (with trailer).

1965 comedy films
1960s English-language films
1965 films
Films directed by Jeremy Summers
British comedy films
1960s British films